Andrew David Leech (born 9 March 1952) is an English former first-class cricketer.

Leech was born at Farnworth in Lancashire and later studied at Jesus College at the University of Oxford. While studying at Oxford, he played first-class cricket for Oxford University in 1972, making his debut against Warwickshire and playing a total of nine first-class matches for Oxford that year. He scored 24 runs in his nine matches, while with his right-arm medium pace bowling, he took just 12 wickets at an average of 43.41 and a best figures of 3 for 40.

References

External links

1952 births
Living people
People from Farnworth
Alumni of Jesus College, Oxford
English cricketers
Oxford University cricketers